This is a list of regions of Guinea by Human Development Index as of 2023 with data for the year 2021.

See also
List of countries by Human Development Index

References 

Guinea
Guinea
Economy of Guinea